WTSC-FM (91.1 FM, "The Source") is a non-commercial campus radio station licensed to serve the greater Potsdam, New York area.  The station is owned by Clarkson University and licensed to Knight & Day Inc.  The WTSC organization is affiliated with the Clarkson University Student Association (CUSA), from whom it receives the majority of its funding.  WTSC is one of the few CUSA affiliated organizations which does not charge a membership fee.

History
WTSC has been on the air since November 1963, at which point it broke away from two other local college stations (WNTC and WCCT).  WTSC provided alternative programming such as live college division I hockey broadcasts.  The great student following led to the station out-living both other stations and its existence today.

It airs a full-service college radio format.

In January 1992, Clarkson University reached an agreement to transfer the license for this station to Knight & Day Incorporated.  The transfer was approved by the FCC on April 27, 1992, and the transaction was consummated on the same day.

References

External links

Radio stations established in 1963
St. Lawrence County, New York
TSC-FM
1963 establishments in New York (state)